Pierre Laurent (born 1 July 1957) is a French politician and journalist. Ex-director of L'Humanité, and former leader of the French Communist Party (PCF).

Career 

His father, Paul Laurent, was a member of the National Assembly of France for Paris and a high-ranking official of the French Communist Party.

Pierre Laurent joined the Union of Communist Students (UEC) when he was studying economics in Paris. He was National Secretary of UEC from 1982 to 1985. After graduating with a master's degree in Economics, he became a journalist for L'Humanité. At first specialized in economic issues, he became chief editor in 1999, and managing editor in 2000.

He became a member of the French Communist Party National Council in 2000 ( congress). He was the main writer of the  Congress resolution in 2009, which he introduced. He was then nominated "national coordinator" (party's number 2), in charge of leading the party's collegial direction. He therefore resigned from L'Humanité.

In 2010, he led the list for the Left Front (together with Alternative citoyenne, les Alternatifs and others) in Île-de-France for the French regional elections. He received 6.55% of the popular vote.

Laurent was elected National Secretary of the French Communist Party in June 2010, replacing Marie-George Buffet.

Laurent supported Emmanuel Macron in the 2nd round of the 2017 French Presidential Election, opposing Marine Le Pen.

Personal life 
Despite reported financial difficulties, Laurent has collected more than €550,000 in wages within the space of 8 years.

References

External links

  Pierre Laurent's website

1957 births
Living people
Politicians from Paris
French Senators of the Fifth Republic
French Communist Party politicians
Senators of Paris
Pantheon-Sorbonne University alumni